, typeset as SAKEROCK, was an instrumental Japanese band.

Led by Gen Hoshino, the group was formed in 2000 by graduates of a high school in Hannō, Saitama. The band was named after a Martin Denny song and performs uplift, melodic instrumental music influenced by jazz, folk, Latin music and exotica. Over the decade, they released more than 10 albums and mini-albums, including soundtracks for Japanese movies, television dramas and stage plays. They were signed to the Kakubarhythm label.

Members
 — guitar, marimba
 — drums, percussion
Member of Cherry's, Good Dog Happy Men and Killing Floor.
 — trombone, scat
 — bass, hawaiian guitar
Left on 26 December 2011.
 — keyboards
Still acts as a support-member.

Both Gen Hoshino and Kenta Hamano pursue acting careers; together with Kei Tanaka and Daichi Itō, they appeared in Kankurō Kudō's 2009 film .

Discography

Albums
Yuta (2003)
Yuta (Renewal) (2003)
Life Cycle (2005)
Penguin Pull Pale Piles Sound Tracks 「Best」 (2005)
 (2006)
with Asa-Chang and Ren Takada as 
Songs of Instrumental (2006)
 original soundtrack (2007)
 original soundtrack (2007)
 (2008)
Muda (2010)
Sayonara (2015)

Mini-albums / EPs
Sakerock (2002) (demo)
 (2004)
 original soundtrack (2006)

Singles
 (2004)
 (2008)

They also contributed music to Isshin Inudō's film  starring Arashi and based on a manga by Shinji Nagashima.

Videos
 (2005)
 (2007)
 (2008)
 (2009)
 (2009)
 (2012)

External links

Gen Hoshino website
Kei Tanaka website

References

Japanese musical groups
Musical groups established in 2000
Musical groups from Saitama Prefecture